Marco Veronese (born 22 May 1976) is an Italian retired footballer and current Primavera Under-19 youth coach of Parma. He spent most of his career at Serie C1, now Lega Pro Prima Divisione. Veronese has played for 13 different clubs.

Biography

Internazionale
Born in Cinisello Balsamo, the Province of Milan, Marco, along with his elder brother Simone, started their career at F.C. Internazionale Milano, one of the Milan giant. He played his first match for first team and at Serie A on 30 October 1994, a 1–0 win to Reggiana. He played 3 matches in the season, all in Serie A.

In the next season, he was farmed to Reggina of Serie B, where he played 16 league appearances. He then played two seasons in Serie C1 for Monza and Prato.

Chievo
In mid-1998 he secured a long-term contract with Serie B club Chievo, a Veronese club. He played 20 league matches with 2 goals for the Serie B mid-table team.

In the next season, he left for Serie B newcomer Alzano Virescit on loan, where he scored once only. In 2000, he left for Serie C1 again, for Modena, where he won the champion.

Veronese remained with Modena, and played 17 league appearances for the club for the Serie B runner-up.
Although Veronese failed to secure a permanent move and followed Modena to Serie A, he earned Serie B mid-table team Vicenza signed him on loan with option to purchase, as part of Ivano Della Morte deal. He rejoined former teammate Andrea Zanchetta.

But he failed to score and to become a regular starter.

Spezia & Pavia
In 2003–04 season, he joined Spezia of Serie C1, a team partially owned by his former club Internazionale. He won Coppa Italia Serie C with club. Co-current with Internazionale sold their shares, Veronese joined A.C. Pavia at the same division and based in Lombardy his hometown located. He finally scored regular with 13 and 11 goals, in although Pavia relegated in 2007.

Late career
He joined Venezia which last season lost in promotion playoffs. He scored 11 goals for the team but just finished in mid-table. In July 2008, he joined Cesena which newly relegated back to Serie C1. He scored only 4 goals with the Lega Pro Prima Divisione Champion. In August 2009, he returned to Lombardy for Lecco. He signed a 2-year contract.

In January 2011 he was exchanged with Stefano Del Sante of Pavia.

Managerial career
Following his retirement Veronese started as assistant coach of A.C. Pavia Primavera team. On 6 December 2013, after the exemption of Alessio Pala, he was named as head coach of the first team, then on 10 January 2014 after three days he was replaced by Patrizio Bensi.

On 28 June 2014 he became assistant coach of Fulvio Pea at Monza in Lega Pro. The following season, he became assistant coach of Cremonese.

On 19 January 2017 Veronese was appointed as assistant manager of Gianni De Biasi at the Albania national football team. He left the position at the end of the season. In September 2017, he joined Deportivo Alavés, once again as the assistant manager of Di Biasi.

On 5 March 2019, he was appointed as manager of ASD Vigor Carpaneto.

On 23 July 2019 he was hired by Parma as their Primavera Under-19 youth coach.

Career statistics

Club

Honours
Coppa Italia Serie C: 2005
Lega Pro Prima Divisione/Serie C1: 2001, 2009

References

External links
 
 
 Profile at Football.it 
 Marco Veronese – ARCHIVIO_GIOCATORE F.C. Internazionale Milano (Official Website) 

1976 births
Living people
People from Cinisello Balsamo
Italian footballers
Association football forwards
Serie A players
Serie B players
Serie C players
Inter Milan players
Reggina 1914 players
A.C. Monza players
A.C. Prato players
A.C. ChievoVerona players
Virtus Bergamo Alzano Seriate 1909 players
Modena F.C. players
L.R. Vicenza players
Spezia Calcio players
F.C. Pavia players
Venezia F.C. players
A.C. Cesena players
Calcio Lecco 1912 players
Footballers from Lombardy
Sportspeople from the Metropolitan City of Milan